Cheated Love is a 1921 American silent drama film directed by King Baggot and starring Carmel Myers, George B. Williams and Allan Forrest.

Cast
 Carmel Myers as Sonya Schonema
 George B. Williams as Abraham Schonema
 Allan Forrest as David Dahlman
 John Davidson as Mischa Grossman
 Ed Brady as Scholom Maruch
 Snitz Edwards as Bernie
 Bowditch M. Turner as Toscha 
 Virginia Harris as Sophia Kettel
 Inez Gomez as Rose Jacobs
 Clara Greenwood as Mrs. Breine
 Meyer Ouhayou as Sam Lupsey
 Laura Pollard as Mrs. Flaherty
 Rose Dione as Madame Yazurka
 Theresa Gray as Mrs. Leshinsky
 Fred Becker as Charles Hensley

References

Bibliography
 Munden, Kenneth White. The American Film Institute Catalog of Motion Pictures Produced in the United States, Part 1. University of California Press, 1997.

External links
 

1921 films
1921 drama films
1920s English-language films
American silent feature films
Silent American drama films
American black-and-white films
Films directed by King Baggot
Universal Pictures films
1920s American films